The 2012 United States presidential election in Oregon took place on November 6, 2012, as part of the 2012 United States presidential election in which all 50 states plus the District of Columbia participated. Oregon voters chose seven electors to represent them in the Electoral College via a popular vote pitting incumbent Democratic President Barack Obama and his running mate, Vice President Joe Biden, against Republican challenger and former Massachusetts Governor Mitt Romney and his running mate, Representative Paul Ryan.

Obama carried Oregon with 54.24% of the vote to Romney's 42.15%, a Democratic victory margin of 12.09%. The Democrats have won the state in every presidential election since 1988, and the Republicans would never seriously contest the state after the 2004 election. Though Romney won a majority of counties, his best performances were in the most sparsely populated regions of the state. Obama's win came from strong support in the densely populated northwestern region of the state, home to Oregon's largest metropolitan areas. Obama won over 75% of the vote in Multnomah County, containing Portland, as well as its surrounding counties, enough to deliver the state to the Democrats by a strong margin. However, the Republican Party managed to improve on their 2008 loss of 16.35% and flipped the counties of Jackson (home to Medford), Marion (home to Salem), and Wasco back into the Republican column.

As of 2020, this is the most recent election where Columbia County and Tillamook County backed the Democratic candidate.

Primaries

Democratic
The Democratic primary was held on May 15, 2012. Barack Obama ran unopposed for the nomination.

Republican

The Republican primary occurred on May 15, 2012.  The only two candidates still in the race were Mitt Romney and U.S. Representative from Texas, Ron Paul. In addition, former Senator from Pennsylvania Rick Santorum and former Speaker of the House Newt Gingrich had withdrawn prior to the election, but their names still appeared on the Oregon ballot.

In order to participate in the primary, voters were required to register to vote by April 24, 2012. A closed primary was used to elect the presidential, legislative, and local partisan offices.  A semi-closed primary, which allowed non-affiliated voters to participate, was used to elect the Attorney General, Secretary of State and Treasurer.

General election

Results

By county

Counties that flipped from Democratic to Republican

 Jackson (largest city: Medford)
 Marion (largest city: Salem)
 Wasco (largest city: The Dalles)

Results by congressional districts
Obama won 4 of 5 congressional districts.

See also
 United States presidential elections in Oregon
 2012 Republican Party presidential debates and forums
 2012 Republican Party presidential primaries
 Results of the 2012 Republican Party presidential primaries
 Oregon Republican Party

References

External links
The Green Papers: for Oregon
The Green Papers: major state elections in chronological order

2012
United States President
Oregon